Proletarsky District is an administrative and municipal district (raion), one of the forty-three in Rostov Oblast, Russia. It is located in the south of the oblast. Its administrative center is the town of Proletarsk. Population: 36,510 (2010 Census);  The population of Proletarsk accounts for 55.5% of the district's total population.

References

Notes

Sources

Districts of Rostov Oblast